Hymenocoleus is a genus of flowering plants in the family Rubiaceae and occurs in tropical Africa.

Species

Hymenocoleus axillaris 
Hymenocoleus barbatus 
Hymenocoleus glaber 
Hymenocoleus globulifer 
Hymenocoleus hirsutus 
Hymenocoleus libericus 
Hymenocoleus multinervis 
Hymenocoleus nervopilosus 
Hymenocoleus neurodictyon 
Hymenocoleus rotundifolius 
Hymenocoleus scaphus 
Hymenocoleus subipecacuanha

References

 
Rubiaceae genera
Taxonomy articles created by Polbot